The Santa Cruz language (locally known as Natügu) is the main language spoken on the island of Nendö or 'Santa Cruz', in the Solomon Islands.

Name
The name Natügu means "our language" (natü "language, word" + -gu "1st + 2nd person plural suffix").

Genetic affiliation
It was widely believed until recently that Santa Cruz was a Papuan language. Like the rest of the Reefs – Santa Cruz languages, however, it has been shown to be a member of the Austronesian language family.

Dialects
Dialects are Bënwë (Banua), Londai, Malo, Nea, Nooli. Speakers of most dialects understand Lwowa and Mbanua well. The Nea and Nooli dialects are the most divergent, actually a separate language (Nalögo).

Phonology

Consonants 

Voiced stops can also be heard as prenasalized.

Vowels

References

External links
Buk Ngr Nzangiongr Anglican Book of Worship in the Natqgu Language
Paradisec has a number of collections with Natügu materials

Languages of the Solomon Islands
Temotu languages